Batata horra is a vegetable dish originating from Lebanon and Syria. It consists of potatoes, red peppers, coriander, chili, and garlic which are all fried together in olive oil.

Etymology
Baṯāṯā ḥārrah literally means "spicy potatoes".

References

Arab cuisine
Syrian cuisine
Potato dishes
Mediterranean cuisine
Lebanese cuisine
Levantine cuisine